There are several  national symbols of Romania, representing Romania or its people in either official or unofficial capacities.